"Someone New" is a song recorded by Irish singer-songwriter Hozier for his 2014 eponymous debut studio album. It was released on 2 March 2015 as the fifth single from the record and peaked at number 13 on the Irish Singles Chart. An accompanying music video was released featuring actress Natalie Dormer.

Writing and composition
"Someone New" is a pop-soul song listed as the fourth track on the album, written by Hozier and Sallay Matu Garnett. It was the oldest song from Hozier's previous demos to make it onto the album; he has stated that it is the track that "resonated with him the least" by release. The song has indie-rock influences with a pizzicato bass, distorted chord progressions, and choral harmonies intertwined with echoing vocals. The lyrics are tongue-in-cheek and have an "overarching theme of love and theistic conflict" and are described as "uplifting" and a confession of his "wandering ways", describing the act of falling in love with strangers. Hozier has stated that it is a "love song [...] about love at its most empty and vacuous and futile."

Critical reception
"Someone New" received generally positive reviews from music critics, with The A.V. Club describing the song as "soulful" and "vintage" and Exclaim! stating that "...while the grandeur of Hozier's majestic vocals explore atmospheric heights, they also plunge cavernous depths as he taps into things primeval and animalistic." The Irish Times praised the track for its "small touches" and "spectral choir", while The Arts Desk gave poor feedback, negatively comparing its guitar work to a James Morrison track.

Commercial performance
The song peaked at number 7 on the Billboard Hot Rock and Alternative Songs Chart, and appeared within the top thirty on the Billboard Adult Contemporary, Adult Top 40, Alternative Airplay, and Rock Airplay charts, respectively. "Someone New" peaked at number 13 on the Irish Singles Chart and scored charting positions in the United Kingdom, Scotland and Canada.

Music video
The official music video for "Someone New" was released on 2 March 2015. It stars actress Natalie Dormer, while Hozier appears only in silhouette. The video shows Dormer's character as a "women whose mercurial tendencies mask an overwhelming loneliness", traveling through the Underground toward the streets of London. She repetitively imagines having romantic encounters and exchanges with fellow passengers and passers-by, while Hozier performs the song in a local pub. It has garnered over 86 million views on YouTube.

Charts

Weekly charts

Year-end charts

Certifications

Release history

References

2015 singles
2013 songs
Hozier (musician) songs
Columbia Records singles
Songs written by Hozier (musician)